Kate de Romero, also known as Doña Kate and Kate Romero, is the wife of former Puerto Rico Governor Carlos Romero Barceló and served as First Lady of Puerto Rico from 1977 to 1985. She also served as a Trustee of the Conservation Trust of Puerto Rico from 1999 to 2008.

Biography

Romero was born as Kathleen Donnelly in Baldwin, a hamlet on New York's Long Island.

While working as a secretary in Manhattan, she went on vacation to Puerto Rico and became interested in living there. After a second vacation, she got a telephone book for Puerto Rico and sent letters to 35 companies to ask about a job. Only two companies replied to her letters, including the San Juan branch of the First National City Bank. She was invited for an interview and traveled back to Puerto Rico, after which she was hired.

Several years later, while living in Puerto Rico, she met lawyer Carlos Romero Barceló and they got married 18 months later, in 1966. Romero Barceló became Mayor of San Juan in 1969 and in 1976 he was elected Governor of Puerto Rico, making Romero the territory's First Lady.

While serving as First Lady, she advocated for the disabled, the elderly, and better education. She supports the movement to grant statehood to Puerto Rico.

In 1999, Romero was appointed to the board of trustees of the Conservation Trust of Puerto Rico. She was reappointed to a second, three-year term in 2005. During her term, she supported issues relating to the environment, the arts, the rights of the disabled, parks, children's causes, education, and Puerto Rico's cultural, historic and artistic heritage.

References

Living people
First Ladies and Gentlemen of Puerto Rico
People from Baldwin, Nassau County, New York
Year of birth missing (living people)
20th-century Puerto Rican women
21st-century Puerto Rican women